The 1973 American 500 was a NASCAR Winston Cup Series racing event that took place on October 21, 1973, at North Carolina Motor Speedway in Rockingham, North Carolina. This event would mark the only instance that a NASCAR Cup Series season would end at Rockingham Speedway. Having a 43-car racing grid was a very infrequent case during this era of NASCAR racing. Today, it forms the mandated standards that NASCAR developed over the years.

This is also the earliest in the year a Cup season has finished since the inaugural season in 1949, and the last time there have been no races in November.

1973 would become the "year of the smaller engine" while declining sponsorship interests for the drivers resulted in NASCAR keeping the bigger gas-guzzling engines from being abolished from the sport. Following this race, NASCAR started to tighten up on their pre-race inspections as a precautionary measure to ensure that only legal racing components are being used.

Background
North Carolina Motor Speedway is a closed racetrack located near Rockingham, North Carolina.  It is affectionately known as "The Rock".

Race report
David Pearson would defeat Buddy Baker by at least one lap after nearly four hours and fifteen minutes of racing. While the green flag was waved at noon, the checkered flag wasn't officially waved until 4:15 PM. An incredible number of people would show up for the race; exactly 48,000 people would see 20 different lead changes and five caution flags for a staggering distance of 36 laps.

Pearson ended the 1973 NASCAR Winston Cup Series season with 18 starts and 11 wins. Every time Pearson was running at the end of a race he finished either 1st, 2nd, or 3rd while leading led 2,658 of 5,338 laps in the process.

The complete racing grid was 43 American-born drivers; including the last-place finisher Frank Warren who crashed on lap 13 out of the 492 laps that made up the advertised distance. Benny Parsons would return to the track after being a part of that lap 13 crash which destroyed the whole right side of his car. Travis Carter, his crew and volunteers, including Ralph Moody and his staff of 20 people managed to complete repairs to Parsons's car in an hour and eight minutes. They had to replace a rear axle, rear suspension, sidebars, braking system, and roll bar cage, cannibalizing parts from a car that did not qualify for the race. He was able to return to the race 136 laps down, to cheers. Parsons would encounter some vibration issues on lap 308 that would knock him out of the race. Even with the DNF, he would slide into a comfortable 28th-place finish.

Only manual transmission vehicles were allowed to participate in this race; a policy that NASCAR has retained to the present day. Other notable drivers in this race included Darrell Waltrip, Elmo Langley, and Richard Childress (now the owner of Richard Childress Racing). Eddie Bond, John Sears, and Paul Tyler would retire from NASCAR after this racing event. Souvenir racing programs were sold at the event for the then-inexpensive cost of $2 USD per copy ($ when adjusted for inflation).

Benny Parsons would eventually win the Winston Cup Championship after this race by a mere 67 points over runner-up Cale Yarborough. Even though Parsons would finish in 28th during the race in his Chevrolet Chevelle Laguna machine, Yarborough's third-place finish would not earn him enough points to overtake the championship lead. Individual race winnings for this event varied in grandeur from the winner's share of $16,795 ($ when adjusted for inflation) to the last-place finisher's share of $485 ($ when adjusted for inflation). NASCAR officials allowed a grand total of $99,715 to be given to the finishers of this racing event ($ when adjusted for inflation).

Qualifying

Top 10 finishers

References

American 500
American 500
NASCAR races at Rockingham Speedway